Werner Israel,  (October 4, 1931 – May 18, 2022) was a physicist, author, researcher, and professor at the University of Victoria.

Biography
Born in Berlin, Germany and raised in Cape Town, South Africa, he first received his B.Sc. in 1951 and later his M.Sc. in 1954 from the University of Cape Town. From 1956 to 1958, he worked as a scholar at the Dublin Institute for Avanced Studies. He then went on to receive his Ph.D. in 1960 from Trinity College, Dublin. 

In 1990, together with Eric Poisson, Israel pioneered the study of black hole interiors and, following up a suggestion of Roger Penrose, discovered the  phenomenon of mass inflation (which should not be confused with inflationary cosmology).

He was a Fellow in the cosmology programme of the Canadian Institute for Advanced Research. Until his retirement in 1996 he  was a professor in the Department of Physics at the University of Alberta. In 1996 he was appointed Adjunct Professor of Physics and Astronomy at the University of Victoria.  Together with Stephen Hawking, he co-edited two volumes on gravitational physics.

Honors 
 1972: Fellow of the Royal Society of Canada
 1974-75: Sherman-Fairchild Distinguished Scholar, CALTECH
 1981: Medal of Achievement in Physics of Canadian Association of Physicists
 1983: University of Alberta Research Prize in Natural Sciences and Engineering
 1984: Izaak Walton Killam Memorial Prize
 1986: Fellow of the Royal Society, London
 1986-91: Senior Research Fellow at the Canadian Institute for Advanced Research
 1994: Officer of the Order of Canada

References

Further reading
 
 
 
 

1931 births
2022 deaths
Canadian physicists
Canadian Fellows of the Royal Society
Fellows of the Royal Society of Canada
Officers of the Order of Canada
Academic staff of the University of Alberta
Academic staff of the University of Victoria
People from Cape Town
South African emigrants to Canada
University of Cape Town alumni
Alumni of Trinity College Dublin
Academics of the Dublin Institute for Advanced Studies